Jens Bodemer (born 20 January 1989) is a German former footballer who played as a goalkeeper, and current manager of Fortuna Billigheim-Ingenheim.

Playing career
Bodemer made his professional debut for 1. FC Heidenheim in the 3. Liga on 21 November 2009, starting in the home match against Carl Zeiss Jena, which finished as a 3–1 win.

Managerial career
In 2015, Bodemer was appointed as player-manager of Viktoria Herxheim, before being sacked later that year. In 2018, he was appointed as manager of Fortuna Billigheim-Ingenheim.

References

External links
 Profile at DFB.de
 Profile at kicker.de
 SV Burbach statistics at Fussball.de

1989 births
Living people
Footballers from Karlsruhe
German footballers
German football managers
Association football goalkeepers
Karlsruher SC II players
1. FC Heidenheim players
3. Liga players
21st-century German people